The  is an  or  (painted narrative handscroll) made in the second half of the 12th century CE, during the Heian period of Japanese history (794–1185). It is an illuminated manuscript detailing miracles attributed to the monk , who lived on Mount Shigi near Nara in Japan in the latter part of the 9th century.

Background

arts
 

Originating in Japan in the sixth or seventh century through trade with the Chinese Empire,  art spread widely among the aristocracy in the Heian period. An  consists of one or more long scrolls of paper narrating a story through  texts and paintings.

The narrative assumes a series of scenes, the rhythm, composition and transitions of which are entirely the artist's sensitivity and technique. The themes of the stories were very varied: illustrations of novels, historical chronicles, religious texts, biographies of famous people, humorous or fantastic anecdotes, etc.

The work and its historical sources

The term "engi" in the title designates a Japanese literary style that transcribes chronicles and legends on the foundation of Buddhist temples or Shinto shrines, as well as, by extension, the miracles associated with them.

Such interest, however, already existed among the Japanese nobility from at least the end of the 11th century, as evidenced by the literature of the Imperial Court.

Several companions joined him, giving  growing importance. According to other fictionalised chronicles,  would have been instructed in a dream during a retreat at the  temple to go to Mount Shigi to settle there, with a purple cloud to guide him.

Description

Overview
The  is made up of three paper scrolls in a horizontal format. On each scroll, calligraphic texts accompany illustrations that have been painted, by hand, using watercolour-like techniques associated with the application of strokes in India ink.

First scroll

The first scroll, commonly titled "The Flying Granary", consists of a single long painted section, the calligraphic text having disappeared. It narrates the anecdote known as the "flying granary".  used to send his bowl by air every day to the nearby village, where a wealthy farmer filled it with rice. One day, however, the farmer refused to take on this task and  punished him by blowing up his entire rice barn. The scroll thus opens with a scene showing the amazement and dismay of the villagers running after the flying granary. Several landscape scenes follow, in which travellers are astonished at this flying granary while the rich farmer on horseback and four of his people pursue their property.

's home then suddenly appears in a mountain landscape. The monk is seated on his terrace, facing his visitors who then appear. The farmer bows to the monk and it is understood that he begs  to give him back his rice. After a new short mountain landscape, we discover  and his visitors in front of the rice granary. A servant places a bag of rice in 's bowl, obviously on the order of the latter who explicitly points a finger at the bowl. The rest of the bags then begin to fly away. There follows, as for the flying granary, a long scene of landscapes flown over by sacks of rice, to the village where the little people are busy with their daily occupations - the women cook or collect fruit, a child and an old man are reading. Finally, a short landscape concludes the painting and the first scroll.

Second scroll

The scroll consists of two portions of calligraphic text and two long painted sections. Several sequences illustrate the delegation's journey through various landscapes, a village and mist. The palace wall completes the first painting.

The second calligraphed section reveals that , despite insistent requests of His Imperial Majesty, has refused to go in person to the palace, and has promised to heal the Emperor from his home. The second painting opens with a view of the Emperor seated in his quarters. Outside, a long landscape shows  flying over fields and farms to the palace, the wheel of dharma rolling in front of him. Following a short landscape, the painting shows the imperial delegation again on their way through plains, mists and mountains. The messenger thanks  in person, and then the painting ends with a landscape lost in the mist.

Third scroll

The third scroll, "The Story of the Nun", recounts the adventures of a nun, 's older sister, in search of her brother whom she has not seen for twenty years. It consists of two calligraphed sections and two painted sections. After the introductory calligraphed text, the first painting opens with a mountain landscape in which an old nun and two men walk. Then the nun, who has arrived at a village, is shown sitting under the porch of a chapel while the villagers bring her food. There follows a new scene of landscape and mist, then the nun, having passed a small  shrine, asks an old peasant for information about her brother. Behind them are the farm and three busy women, one in the garden and two washing the laundry. We then discover the nun sitting on the doorstep of the farm, chatting with a young woman who spins wool. We also see through the windows a woman and children scrutinizing the travellers with curiosity, as well as a man rebuffing two dogs barking outside. A new landscape again shows the nun travelling, fallow deer indicating that she is in the Nara region. Then the nun, following her arrival at the  temple, is painted praying in front of the  monumental statue. The nun is shown several times (a technique of representation of time passing) in the scene at the foot of the monumental statue, praying, sleeping or meditating. The temple disappears in the mist, then a landscape scene follows, completing the painting.

The second calligraphed section relates that the   appeared in the nun's dreams to guide her to her brother. In the second painting,  looks outward as if someone has called him; in front of him stands his sister. There follows a landscape where a purple cloud appears in the air, an omen indicating that the nun was guided to Mount Shigi by this cloud. The nun then settles down with her brother, and the last scene paints the two protagonists in different activities, such as praying, reading sutras or preparing religious rituals. A mountain landscape closes the painting, in which the roof of the flying granary of the first scroll can be seen.

Dating, author and sponsor

The exact date of creation of the scrolls is not known. Art historians commonly date the work as being from the middle or second half of the 12th century (the end of the Heian period), probably between 1157 and 1180, but without certainty. This estimate is based on the dating of architectural details reproduced in the work. The style of calligraphy is also close to those in vogue during the last quarter of the 12th century. Although that date remains approximate, it nevertheless makes the  one of the oldest  preserved today.

The author and the sponsor are not better known. However, that allocation has been refuted, as  died in 1140 while the scrolls are consensually dated by art historians as being from the second half of the 12th century

The burlesque, even caricatural aspect of the faces in the scrolls also recall the humorous sketches that have been found in the margins of religious paintings produced by the workshops of Buddhist temples; Buddhist imagery is similarly very precise, suggesting that the author of the scrolls was also familiar with the religious world. Thus, the work can be attributed to a professional court painter as well as to a Buddhist painter, without it being possible to distinguish between the two worlds. This difficulty of attribution is not surprising insofar as, at the end of the Heian period, the activity of court and temple painters largely overlapped.

As for the sponsor, also unknown, a working hypothesis considers him to have belonged to the learned circles of the court, for example the Fujiwara clan or the Emperor Go-Shirakawa, because of the diversity of the motifs represented.

Style and composition

The pictorial style of the  falls within the  movement, which predominated in Japanese painting in the Heian and Kamakura periods (1185–1333). More precisely, the style is part of a sub-genre of  called  (lit. "painting of a man"). The  style is characterised by the depiction of the life of the people outside the palace and the staging of historical and epic events, as opposed to the intimate and romanticised  about life in the palace.  of the  genre emphasize dynamic images rather than text. The transitions between scenes are cleverly integrated into the composition, and allow variation of the rhythm, in particular thanks to close-ups, or the insertion of calm landscapes and mists. 

First, the painter can spread a single narrative moment over several scenes of the scroll, to create suspense, an epic story or simply the passing of time. Secondly, the painter can condense several stages of the story into a single scene, allowing the action to be imaged with great economy of means.

The artistic dimension of the scrolls also follows the canons of the  style. Thus, the paintings are dynamic and fluid, relying mainly on the curves and ink lines which really constitute the heart of the composition. The colour thus gives way at the line, being affixed only in a discreet tone and revealing the bare paper. The painters mainly used vegetable pigments, the opacity of which varies according to the amount of water used for their dilution. As the paper absorbs these colours with water, gradation effects are created naturally, giving a realistic rendering and facilitating transitions between scenes, for example by creating a light mist in which the landscape is lost, or gradual blurring of the colour giving way to bare paper. The same process is used with India ink to obtain different levels of grey.

To create perspective, the painter also uses bird formations that gradually become smaller and smaller, a process originating in Chinese painting. This Chinese influence is also found in the rugged mountain landscapes, executed with great mastery through soft lines and ink strokes for the reliefs.

The work is characterised by the painter's desire to represent the daily life of the people: peasants, merchants, monks, women ... This bias confers a lively and authentic, almost documentary aspect to the scrolls, and gives the painter every opportunity to deviate from the text to imagine adventures or new details, for example the solitary peregrinations of the nun (third scroll) or the rural life painted in the landscapes during the flight of the bags of rice (first scroll). The faces, painted in a human and popular, almost caricatural way, express a wide range of emotions: confusion, agitation, excitement alternate with each other. These expressive faces, whose details are underlined in ink, contrast with the stylised faces of the court paintings, and foreshadow the more realistic iconography that will dominate in  during the following century.

The wheel that precedes it evokes that of Dharma (Dharmachakra), an ancient and powerful Buddhist symbol, here underlining the power of this deity.

As for the calligraphies, they are very parsimonious, having only a function of summary presentation of the story, except for the first scroll where the text has completely disappeared.

Historiographical value

In view of their themes and narration, the scrolls have a certain historiographical value with respect to the life of their time. So, for example, the genre scenes of the first and third scrolls show the chores of the common people, for example the peasant women drawing water from the well, washing the laundry, spinning or even breastfeeding their children. The scrolls also facilitate observation of the work or hobbies of common people, such as cooking, gardening, reading, and watching over children.

Studies by historians have focused in particular on habitat, tools (oven, press), rural work, customs and social practices (such as hospitality), clothing, food and travel.

On the other hand, the scrolls present many details of the religious and secular architecture of the time (the imperial palace, the temples and the cottages of the peasants); in the first scroll, the habitat of the rich farmer offers many details of the thatched roof, the hearth, the kitchen, the palisades ...

The monk's journeys also occupy a large place in the narration, and include depictions of the historical  trade route, which connected Mino with Matsumotodaira, then finally Kyoto, as well as the small shrines and state-maintained inns along the route.  Some details are still unclear today, such as the exact meaning of the marks drawn on some farms.

Provenance

The  has belonged to the Chōgosonshi-ji temple since its inception, but is stored in the Nara National Museum. The work was designated as a National Treasure of Japan on 9 June 1951, and it was on that occasion that its current title, was adopted, although the scrolls do not mention that title. From the beginning of April to the end of May 2016, the Nara National Museum organized a special exhibition, during which all three painted scrolls, spread out over their entire length, were presented to the public for the first time.

The  appears not to have survived in its original form, as suggested by the absence of text in the first scroll, perhaps due to alterations or old reassembling. Today, there is no consensus on the original form of the work; the existing hypotheses envisage the simple disappearance of the texts of the first scroll, the disappearance of a few painted scenes, or of an entire painting at the start of the first scroll, or even the reassembly of the sheets making up the scrolls in a different order. The pictorial pigments have also largely disappeared in various places.

Contemporary study and appreciation
It has been the subject of dozens of academic articles, and in particular makes it possible to study the formation of the  movement in the Heian period, very few earlier paintings having survived. It also illustrates the refinement of narrative painting at the end of the Heian period, foreshadowing the golden age of the  during the Kamakura period that followed.

See also
List of National Treasures of Japan (paintings)
National Treasure (Japan)

References

Footnotes

Notes

Bibliography 

 
 
 
 , reissued in 1991 as part of the series Shinpen meihō nihon no bijutsu, 

External links

Emakimono
National Treasures of Japan
History of art in Japan
Buddhist paintings